Palaivana Solai is a 1981 Indian Tamil-language buddy drama film written, directed and photographed by the duo Robert–Rajasekar in their directorial debut. The film stars Chandrasekhar, Janagaraj, Rajeev, Kailash Nath, Thyagu and Suhasini. It revolves around five friends whose lives are transformed by a new girl arriving in their locality.

Palaivana Solai was released on 1 May 1981. The film became a box-office success, running for over 200 days in theatres. In 1982, it was remade in Telugu as Manchu Pallaki (with Suhasini reprising her role) and in Malayalam as Ithu Njangalude Katha. In 2009 it was again remade in Tamil under the same title.

Plot 
Bachelors Sekhar, Senthil, Kumar, Vasu and Siva are friends. Sekhar is a factory worker, Senthil and Kumar are unemployed (with Kumar dependent on his wealthy father), Vasu works at an office and Siva is an aspiring actor. They spend their time sitting on a wall and teasing people, particularly young girls, seeking neighbouring girls to befriend.

A girl named Geetha arrives in the locality and stays in a rented house. The friends initially tease her in their usual manner, but she sportingly retaliates and gradually becomes friendly with them. Her purpose of visiting the city is not known to them. Each of them tries to attract her and come closer to her. However, her focus is on helping others.

Geetha helps Vasu to find a groom for his sister; she changes Senthil's aggressive behaviour and helps him secure a job; she financially helps Siva to send money to his family; makes Kumar understand the importance of respecting his father; and gives emotional support to the rebellious Sekhar. She becomes the centre of all the friends’ activities.

Sekhar develops a soft corner for Geetha. She too likes him, but understands her limitations and does not express it. Vasu learns through a pharmacist from whom she purchases medicines that Geetha is terminally ill. When he asks her about this, she requests him not to reveal this fact to his friends.

When the marriage of Vasu's sister is fixed, one of his colleagues promises to provide money for the dowry. But on the day of the marriage, he is unable to keep his word and the marriage is cancelled due to this. Geetha requests Sekhar to marry Vasu's sister if he respects her and wishes to make her happy. She reveals her terminal illness and that her days are numbered; Sekhar assents to the marriage. Before the event ends, Geetha faints and is hospitalised.

The five friends go out of their way to organise funds for Geetha's treatment, forgetting their egos and past issues. Though the operation eventually takes place, Geetha dies after requesting the five friends to be happy and kind to everyone.

Cast 
Chandrasekhar as Sekhar
Janagaraj as Senthil
Rajeev as Kumar
Kailash Nath as Vasu
Thyagu as Siva
Suhasini as Geetha
Kalaivani as Vasu's sister

Production 
Palaivana Solai is the directorial debut of Robert–Rajasekar (Robert Asirvatham and S. Rajasekar). Both also handled cinematography and wrote the screenplay based on Rajasekar's story. The film was shot predominantly on the Nungambakkam Highway, Chennai.

Soundtrack 
The soundtrack was composed by the duo Shankar–Ganesh, with lyrics written by Vairamuthu. "Megame Megame" is set in the raga known as Karnaranjani, and was based on "Tum Nahi Gham Nahi Sharab Nahi", a Ghazal by Jagjit Singh.

Release and reception 
Palaivana Solai was released on 1 May 1981. Ananda Vikatan gave the film an A score, praising Suhasini's performance and the unconventional screenplay. The film became a box-office success, running for over 200 days in theatres.

Remakes 
Palaivana Solai was remade in Telugu as Manchu Pallaki (1982), with Suhasini reprising her role. It was also remade in Malayalam as Ithu Njangalude Katha (1982), and again in Tamil in 2009 under the same title. This version featured remixed versions of "Aalanaalum Aalu" and "Megame Megame". A Hindi remake was planned in the early 1980s and Suhasini was offered to reprise her role, but did not come to fruition.

Legacy 
Commentators regard Palaivana Solai as a landmark film in Tamil cinema for proving that males can be friends with females without falling in love. Other Tamil films that followed the trope include Pudhu Vasantham (1990) and Punnagai Desam (2002).

References

Bibliography

External links 

1980s buddy drama films
1980s Tamil-language films
1981 directorial debut films
1981 films
Films scored by Shankar–Ganesh
Indian buddy drama films
Tamil films remade in other languages